Nanaimo City was a provincial electoral district in the city of Nanaimo, British Columbia in Canada from 1890 to 1912.  It was one of two Nanaimo ridings at the time, created out of the older Nanaimo riding (1871 to 1928), with intermediary ridings The Islands and Nanaimo and the Islands. The name Nanaimo was restored as a riding name in the 1996 election.

For other current and historical federal and provincial Nanaimo-area ridings please see Nanaimo (electoral districts).

Demographics

Geography

Other historical Nanaimo ridings

Nanaimo 1871-1928
Nanaimo and the Islands -1963
South Nanaimo
North Nanaimo
The Islands

Nanaimo riding did not appear in the 1909 election, but Nanaimo City and The Islands were the Nanaimo-area ridings in the 1909 or 1912 election.

In 1933 there was a Cowichan-Newcastle riding, while in 1937 the riding of Newcastle (southern and upland of metropolitan Nanaimo and the Gulf Islands to the southeast) appeared in the 1916 election, as did a new riding called The Islands which lasted until the 1937 election.  Part of that area is now represented by North Saanich and the Islands, which had previously been Saanich and the Islands.

Current Nanaimo-area ridings

Nanaimo 1996–present
Nanaimo-Parksville

Election results
Note:  Winners of each election are in bold.

|-

|Labour 1
|Thomas Keith
|align="right"|Accl.
|align="right"| -.- %
|align="right"|
|align="right"|unknown
|- bgcolor="white"
!align="right" colspan=3|Total valid votes
!align="right"|n/a
!align="right"| -.- %
!align="right"|
|- bgcolor="white"
!align="right" colspan=3|Total rejected ballots
!align="right"|
!align="right"|
!align="right"|
|- bgcolor="white"
!align="right" colspan=3|Turnout
!align="right"|%
!align="right"|
!align="right"|
|- bgcolor="white"
!align="right" colspan=7|1   The first labour candidates elected to the Legislature. Forster and Keith were both nominated by the Miners' and Mine Labourers' Protective Association (MMLPA) and campaigned on the "Workingmen's Platform" of the Workingmen's Campaign Committee. 
|}

|-

|Labour
|Thomas Keith
|align="right"|411
|align="right"|48.81%
|align="right"|
|align="right"|unknown

|- bgcolor="white"
!align="right" colspan=3|Total valid votes
!align="right"|842
!align="right"|100.00%
!align="right"|
|- bgcolor="white"
!align="right" colspan=3|Total rejected ballots
!align="right"|
!align="right"|
!align="right"|
|- bgcolor="white"
!align="right" colspan=3|Turnout
!align="right"|%
!align="right"|
!align="right"|
|}

|-

|- bgcolor="white"
!align="right" colspan=3|Total valid votes
!align="right"|848
!align="right"|100.00%
!align="right"|
|- bgcolor="white"
!align="right" colspan=3|Total rejected ballots
!align="right"|
!align="right"|
!align="right"|
|- bgcolor="white"
!align="right" colspan=3|Turnout
!align="right"|55.37%
!align="right"|
!align="right"|
|}

|-
 
|Labour 2
|Ralph Smith
|align="right"|763 	
|align="right"|89.87%
|align="right"|
|align="right"|unknown

|- bgcolor="white"
!align="right" colspan=3|Total valid votes
!align="right"|849
!align="right"|100.00%
!align="right"|
|- bgcolor="white"
!align="right" colspan=3|Total rejected ballots
!align="right"|
!align="right"|
!align="right"|
|- bgcolor="white"
!align="right" colspan=3|Turnout
!align="right"|%
!align="right"|
!align="right"|
|- bgcolor="white"
!align="right" colspan=7|2  Nanaimo (Independent) Labour Party candidate supported by R.E. McKechnie, former Member and supporter of the Provincial Party. Also endorsed by Nanaimo Trades and Labour Council. The N(I)LP appears to have been only loosely organized although a detailed platform was drawn up.
|}

|Nanaimo (Independent) Labour Party 3
|Henry (Harry) Shepherd
|align="right"|294 	 	
|align="right"|26.61%
|align="right"|
|align="right"|unknown
|- bgcolor="white"
!align="right" colspan=3|Total valid votes
!align="right"|1,105 	
!align="right"|100.00%
!align="right"|
|- bgcolor="white"
!align="right" colspan=3|Total rejected ballots
!align="right"|
!align="right"|
!align="right"|
|- bgcolor="white"
!align="right" colspan=3|Turnout
!align="right"|%
!align="right"|
!align="right"|
|- bgcolor="white"
!align="right" colspan=7|3  Nominated by the Nanaimo (Independent) Labour Party which had the support and participation of local Liberals (Loosmore, pp. 195–6). During the 1907 election he was referred to as having been a "Liberal-Labour candidate" in the 1903 election.
|}

|Independent) Labour Party 4
|Henry (Harry) Shepherd
|align="right"|290 	 	
|align="right"|32.01%
|align="right"|
|align="right"|unknown
|- bgcolor="white"
!align="right" colspan=3|Total valid votes
!align="right"|906
!align="right"|100.00%
!align="right"|
|- bgcolor="white"
!align="right" colspan=3|Total rejected ballots
!align="right"|
!align="right"|
!align="right"|
|- bgcolor="white"
!align="right" colspan=3|Turnout
!align="right"|%
!align="right"|
!align="right"|
|- bgcolor="white"
!align="right" colspan=7|4   The nomination list printed in the newspapers identifies Shepherd as a Liberal. CPG labels both Shepherd and Thomas "Socialists" and Gosnell (who spells Shepherd as Sheppard, as do some other sources) has them as "L.-Soc.", which could be either Liberal or Labour-Socialist. One newspaper refers to Shepherd as a member of the "Nanaimo Liberal Party", another as a nominee of the "Independent Labour Party", "a peculiar combination of Liberal politicians" (Vancouver Province 29 December 1906, p. 1). Thomas is also reported as a nominee of the "Independent Labour Party" in Ladysmith. Shepherd ran as a Liberal in 1912, Thomas as a straight Independent in 1909. 
|}

|- bgcolor="white"
!align="right" colspan=3|Total valid votes
!align="right"|1,250 
!align="right"|100.00%
!align="right"|
|- bgcolor="white"
!align="right" colspan=3|Total rejected ballots
!align="right"|
!align="right"|
!align="right"|
|- bgcolor="white"
!align="right" colspan=3|Turnout
!align="right"|%
!align="right"|
!align="right"|
|}

 
|Liberal
|Henry (Harry) Shepherd
|align="right"|375 	
|align="right"|23.82%
|align="right"|
|align="right"|unknown
|- bgcolor="white"
!align="right" colspan=3|Total valid votes
!align="right"|1,574 
!align="right"|100.00%
!align="right"|
|- bgcolor="white"
!align="right" colspan=3|Total rejected ballots
!align="right"|
!align="right"|
!align="right"|
|- bgcolor="white"
!align="right" colspan=3|Turnout
!align="right"|%
!align="right"|
!align="right"|
|}	

The name Nanaimo City was dropped after the 1912 election.  In the 1916 election the Nanaimo name was used.

External links 
Elections BC historical returns

Former provincial electoral districts of British Columbia on Vancouver Island
Politics of Nanaimo